Leland Maurice Mendelson (March 24, 1933 – December 25, 2019) was an American animation producer and the executive producer of the many Peanuts animated specials.

Biography
Mendelson was born in San Francisco and grew up in San Mateo graduating from San Mateo High School. He graduated from Stanford University in 1954 with a degree in English. He was lieutenant in the Air Force for three years. He then worked several years for his father, a vegetable grower and shipper.

Career
Mendelson's career in television began in 1961, when he started working at San Francisco's KPIX-TV, where he created public service announcements. A fortunate find of some antique film footage of the 1915 San Francisco World's Fair led to Mendelson's first production, a documentary entitled The Innocent Fair. The documentary was the first in a series on the history of the city, San Francisco Pageant, for which Mendelson won a Peabody Award.

Mendelson left KPIX in 1963 to form his own production company. His first work was a documentary on Willie Mays, A Man Named Mays. Shortly after the documentary aired, Mendelson came across a Peanuts comic strip that revolved around Charlie Brown's baseball team. Mendelson thought that since he'd just "done the world's greatest baseball player, now [he] should do the world's worst baseball player, Charlie Brown." Mendelson approached Peanuts creator Charles Schulz with the idea of producing a documentary on Schulz and his strip. Schulz, who had enjoyed the Mays documentary, readily agreed. The unaired 1963 documentary, A Boy Named Charlie Brown, was the beginning of a 30-year collaboration between Schulz and Mendelson.

While Mendelson was attempting to find a market for the Schulz documentary, he was approached by The Coca-Cola Company, who asked him if he was interested in producing an animated Christmas special for television. Mendelson was, and he immediately contacted Schulz in regards to using the Peanuts characters. Schulz in turn suggested hiring animator and director Bill Melendez, whom Schulz had worked with while creating a Peanuts-themed advertising campaign for the Ford Motor Company. Mendelson also hired jazz composer Vince Guaraldi after hearing Cast Your Fate to the Wind, a Guaraldi-composed song while driving across the Golden Gate Bridge.

After a hurried six-month production period, A Charlie Brown Christmas aired December 9, 1965 on CBS. The show won both an Emmy and a Peabody award and was the first of over 40 animated Peanuts specials created by Mendelson, Melendez and Schulz. In addition they collaborated on The Charlie Brown and Snoopy Show, which ran on Saturday mornings during the 1980s.

In 1968, Mendelson produced the documentary Travels with Charley, based upon the book by John Steinbeck.

Mendelson founded and headed Lee Mendelson Film Productions, a Burlingame, California-based television and film production company. Mendelson Productions has produced over 100 television and film productions, winning 12 Emmys and 4 Peabodys as well as numerous Grammy, Emmy, and Oscar nominations. Mendelson died on December 25, 2019, from lung cancer, leaving a wife, Ploenta and four children including Lynda.

References

External links
 
 

1933 births
2019 deaths
Businesspeople from San Francisco
Deaths from lung cancer in California
Film producers from California
Peabody Award winners
People from San Mateo, California
Primetime Emmy Award winners
Stanford University alumni
Television producers from California
American animated film producers
United States Air Force officers
Military personnel from California
20th-century American businesspeople